Dale Lee (born 15 July 1991) is a Montserratian international footballer who plays for English club Barkingside, as a midfielder.

Career
Born in Plymouth, Lee has played club football for Romford, Rhyl, Prestatyn Town and Barkingside.

Lee made his international debut for Montserrat on 17 June 2011, in a FIFA World Cup qualifier. He earned a further 3 caps in the 2012 Caribbean Cup. He earned a total of four caps to date between 2011 and 2012.

References

1991 births
Living people
Montserratian footballers
Montserrat international footballers
Romford F.C. players
Rhyl F.C. players
Prestatyn Town F.C. players
Barkingside F.C. players
Association football midfielders
Montserratian expatriate footballers
Montserratian expatriate sportspeople in Wales
Expatriate footballers in Wales
Montserratian expatriate sportspeople in England
Expatriate footballers in England